Blue Mountain Lake is a reservoir in Arkansas, United States. A U.S. Army Corps of Engineers Lake on the Petit Jean River in west central Arkansas, Blue Mountain Lake has approximately 50 miles of shoreline, located between Mount Magazine and the Ouachita Mountains just west of Havana, Arkansas.

Blue Mountain Dam was built in 1947 as a 115-foot-high, 2800-foot-long earthen structure, creating a reservoir with a surface area of about 4.5 square miles, about 50 miles of shoreline, and a maximum capacity of 258,000 acre-feet.  Dam and reservoir are owned by operated by the United States Army Corps of Engineers.

The lake offers fishing, boating, swimming and camping; it is also the focal point of the view from the lodge atop Mount Magazine, home of Mount Magazine State Park.

Blue Mountain Lake is accessible from Highway 10 west of Havana by turning south on Highway 309.  Waveland Park is the primary access point to the lake, with Lick Creek and Ashley Creek providing limited access as well.

References

Bibliography
Farquhar, Carley (1966). The Sportsman's Almanac. New York: Harper and Row.
Sutton, Keith B (2000). Fishing Arkansas. Fayatteville: University of Arkansas Press.

External links
USACE Profile: Blue Mountain Lake

Encyclopedia of Arkansas History & Culture entry

Protected areas of Logan County, Arkansas
Reservoirs in Arkansas
Protected areas of Yell County, Arkansas
Buildings and structures in Yell County, Arkansas
Buildings and structures in Logan County, Arkansas
Dams in Arkansas
United States Army Corps of Engineers dams
Dams completed in 1947
Bodies of water of Yell County, Arkansas
Bodies of water of Logan County, Arkansas
1947 establishments in Arkansas